The 2015–16 Red Stripe Premier League is the highest competitive football league in Jamaica. It is the 42nd edition of the competition. It started on September 6, 2015 and ended on May 17, 2016.

Changes from 2014–15 
 UWI F.C. and Portmore United were promoted from the Jamaican Major Leagues (second tier football). 
 Barbican  and Sporting Central Academy were relegated to the Jamaican Major Leagues (second tier football).

Teams 
Team information at the start of the 2015-2016 season

Managerial Changes 

Linval Wilson is still the head coach of Humble Lions.

League table

Playoffs
The two finalists qualify for the 2017 Caribbean Club Championship. All times EST (UTC−5).

Bracket

Semi-finals 
Game One

Game Two

Montego Bay United advanced 4–3 on aggregate.

Portmore United advanced 4–3 on aggregate.

Final

Top goalscorers 
Updated as of March 30, 2016

References

External links
 Jamaicafootballfederation.com

National Premier League seasons
1
Jam